The Legend (Hangul: 전설; also known as Legend) was a South Korean boy band formed by SS Entertainment (formerly JK Space Entertainment) in Seoul, South Korea. The group consisted of five members: Listen, Roi, Jaehyuk, Lito and Changsun. They debuted on July 9, 2014 with the single "Left Out". They officially disbanded in May 2017, after their contracts with SS Entertainment were canceled through a lawsuit.

Members
 Listen (Hangul: 리슨)
 Roi (로이)
 Jaehyuk (제혁)
 Lito (리토)
 Changsun (창선)

Discography

Extended plays

Singles

References

External links
 The Legend Official on YouTube

K-pop music groups
South Korean boy bands
South Korean dance music groups
Musical groups from Seoul
Musical groups established in 2014
2014 establishments in South Korea
Musical groups disestablished in 2017
2017 disestablishments in South Korea
South Korean pop music groups